George Allister Souza Sr. (7 January 1917 – 27 March 1983) was a Hong Kong international lawn bowler.

Bowls career
Souza was born in Hong Kong on 7 January 1917, to Portuguese parents. He represented Hong Kong at cricket from 1953 to 1961 and won a gold medal in the fours at the 1970 Commonwealth Games in Edinburgh with Abdul Kitchell, Saco Delgado and Roberto da Silva.

Personal life and death
Souza was an electric company employee by trade and his son George Souza Jr. became a world bowls champion.

Souza died in Hong Kong on 27 March 1983, at the age of 66.

References

1917 births
1983 deaths
Commonwealth Games medallists in lawn bowls
Hong Kong sportsmen
Bowls players at the 1970 British Commonwealth Games
Commonwealth Games gold medallists for Hong Kong
Hong Kong male bowls players
Medallists at the 1970 British Commonwealth Games